Qul is a word of Turkic origin meaning 'slave'.

Uses of the word

In Central Asia, Azerbaijan, Iran and South Asia

List of given names derived from qul

 Abbas Quli
 Ahmad Quli
 Alim Quli, notably borne by
 Alimqul
 Ali Quli
 Allah Quli
 Bayan Quli, notably borne by
 Bayan Qulï
 Hasan Quli
 Husayn Quli
 Ibrahim Quli, notably borne by
 Ibrahim Quli Qutb Shah Wali
 Imam Quli
 Iman Quli
 Ishan Quli, notably borne by
 Işanguly Nuryýew
 Jafar Quli
 Jamshid Quli, notably borne by
 Jamsheed Quli Qutb Shah

 Mahdi Quli
 Makhdum Quli, notably borne by
 Magtymguly Pyragy
 Muhammad Quli
 Murshid Quli, notably borne by
 Murshid Quli Khan
 Murtada Quli
 Najaf Quli
 Qurban Quli
 Rida Quli
 Safi Quli
 Shah Quli
 Subhan Quli, notably borne by
 Subhan Quli Qutb Shah
 Sultan Quli, notably borne by
 Sultan Quli Qutb-ul-Mulk
 Tahmasb Quli

List of surnames derived from qul
 as first element:
 , 
 
 
 
 
 in compounds:
  (notably borne by Rasim Aliguliyev),  (notably borne by Jalil Mammadguluzadeh), 
  (notably borne by Ruslan Imankulov)

In the Ottoman Empire
In the Ottoman Empire, the word qul was used in rank names of the Janissaries such as kapıkulu and kul kethüdâsı.

See also
 Abd (Arabic)
 Ghulam

References

Further reading
 

Turkic words and phrases